Meierhoffer House is a historic home located at Boonville, Cooper County, Missouri. It was built about 1900, and is a one-story, vernacular brick dwelling with a central hall plan. It has a gable roof, arched window and door headers, and partially expose basement.

It was listed on the National Register of Historic Places in 1990.

See also 
 Meierhoffer Sand Company Office Building
 National Register of Historic Places listings in Cooper County, Missouri

References

Houses on the National Register of Historic Places in Missouri
Houses completed in 1900
Houses in Cooper County, Missouri
National Register of Historic Places in Cooper County, Missouri
1900 establishments in Missouri
Boonville, Missouri
Central-passage houses